The 2017–18 season was Tottenham Hotspur's 26th season in the Premier League and 40th successive season in the top division of the English football league system. Along with the Premier League, the club competed in the Champions League, FA Cup and EFL Cup. Following the rebuilding of White Hart Lane, Spurs played all home fixtures at Wembley Stadium during this season at full 90,000 capacity. The season also marked a change in kit suppliers as Nike replaced Under Armour.

The season covered the period from 1 July 2017 to 30 June 2018.

Squad

Current squad
{| class="wikitable" style="text-align:center;width:80%"
|-
! style="background:#000080; color:white; text-align:center;"| Squad No.
! style="background:#000080; color:white; text-align:center;"| Name
! style="background:#000080; color:white; text-align:center;"| Nationality
! style="background:#000080; color:white; text-align:center;"| Position(s)
! style="background:#000080; color:white; text-align:center;"| Date of Birth (Age)
|-
! colspan="5" style="background:#dcdcdc; text-align:center;"| Goalkeepers
|-
| 1
| Hugo Lloris (C)
| 
| GK
| 
|-
| 13
| Michel Vorm
| 
| GK
| 
|-
|22
|Paulo Gazzaniga
|
|GK
|

|-
! colspan="5" style="background:#dcdcdc; text-align:center;"| Defenders
|-
| 2
| Kieran Trippier
| 
| RB / RWB
| 
|-
| 3
| Danny Rose
| 
| LB / LWB
| 
|-
| 4
| Toby Alderweireld
| 
| CB / RB
| 
|-
| 5
| Jan Vertonghen (2nd VC)| 
| CB / LB
| 
|-
| 6
| Davinson Sánchez
| 
| CB / RB
| 
|-
| 21
| Juan Foyth
| 
| CB / DM
| 
|-
| 24
| Serge Aurier
| 
| RB / RWB
| 
|-
| 33
| Ben Davies
| 
| LB / LWB / CB
| 
|-
| 37
| Kyle Walker-Peters
| 
| RB / LB
| 
|-
! colspan="5" style="background:#dcdcdc; text-align:center;"| Midfielders
|-
| 11
| Erik Lamela
| 
| RW / LW
| 
|-
| 12
| Victor Wanyama
| 
| DM / CM
| 
|-
| 15
| Eric Dier
| 
| DM / CB
| 
|-
| 17
| Moussa Sissoko
| 
| CM / RM
| 
|-
| 19
| Mousa Dembélé
| 
| CM / DM
| 
|-
| 20
| Dele Alli
| 
| CM / AM
| 
|-
| 23
| Christian Eriksen
| 
| AM / LW / RW
| 
|-
| 27
| Lucas Moura
| 
| RW
| 
|-
| 29
| Harry Winks
| 
| CM / DM
| 
|-
! colspan="12" style="background:#dcdcdc; text-align:center;"| Strikers
|-
| 7
| Son Heung-min
| 
| FW / LW / RW
| 
|-
| 10
| Harry Kane (1st VC)| 
| FW / SS
| 
|-
| 18
| Fernando Llorente
| 
| FW
| 
|}

Transfers

Released

Loans out

Transfers in

Transfers out

Overall transfer activity

Expenditure
Summer:  £87,000,000

Winter:  £25,000,000

Total:  £112,000,000

Income
Summer:  £76,750,000

Winter:  £0

Total:  £76,750,000

Net totals
Summer:  £10,250,000

Winter:  £25,000,000

Total:  £35,250,000

Friendlies

Pre-season
On 21 March 2017, it was announced that Tottenham Hotspur would take part in the 2017 International Champions Cup playing against Paris Saint-Germain, Roma and Manchester City in the United States. On 4 July 2017, it was announced that Tottenham would welcome Juventus to play a friendly match in Wembley Stadium. Tottenham Hotspur played a closed door match in Hotspur Way against Leyton Orient on 12 July 2017.

Friendlies

2017 International Champions Cup

Competitions

Overview

{| class="wikitable" style="text-align: center"
|-
!rowspan=2|Competition
!colspan=8|Record
|-
!
!
!
!
!
!
!
!
|-
| Premier League

|-
| FA Cup

|-
| EFL Cup

|-
| Champions League

|-
! Total

Premier League

League table

Result summary

Results by matchday

Matches
On 14 June 2017, the 2017–18 Premier League fixtures were announced.

FA Cup

Spurs entered the competition in the third round and were handed a home tie against AFC Wimbledon.

EFL Cup

Tottenham Hotspur entered the competition in the third round and were drawn at home against Barnsley. Another home tie was confirmed for the fourth round, against West Ham United.

UEFA Champions League

Group stage

On 24 August 2017, Tottenham was drawn into Group H alongside Real Madrid, Borussia Dortmund and APOEL.

Round of 16

Statistics

Appearances

Goal scorersThe list is sorted by shirt number when total goals are equal. Hat-tricks 

Own goals

Clean sheetsThe list is sorted by shirt number when total clean sheets are equal.''

References

Tottenham Hotspur
Tottenham Hotspur F.C. seasons
Tottenham Hotspur
Tottenham
Tottenham